The representation of African Americans in media – speech, writing, still or moving pictures – has been a major concern in mainstream American culture and a component of media bias in the United States.

Such media representation is not always seen in a positive light and propagates controversial and misconstrued images of what African Americans represent. "Research on the portrayal of African Americans in prime-time television from 1955 to 1986 found that only 6 percent of the characters were African-Americans, while 89 percent of the TV population was white." This under-representation has reversed, however, according to a 2018 report from the Department of Social Sciences at UCLA, which states that, despite making up less than 13% of the US population, "Blacks were over-represented among actors in broadcast scripted shows in 2015-16, claiming 17 percent of the roles."

Since local news media is a primary source of information for many people, it plays a vital role in policy debates regarding civil rights, the public's general knowledge of minority communities, as well as a broader and more comprehensive worldview. The debate of ownership diversity affecting content diversity also contributes to the idea that in order for African Americans to be well represented in the media, there needs to be African-American ownership in the media.

Examples of misrepresentation 

Little Black Sambo is an 1899 children's book where the protagonist, a South Indian boy, encounters four hungry tigers. To avoid being eaten by the tigers, he surrenders his colorful new clothes, shoes, and umbrella. The tigers chase each other around a tree until they are reduced to a pool of melted butter. Sambo recovers his clothes, and his mother makes pancakes with the butter. Sambo was depicted as a perpetual child, not capable of living as an independent adult". It was said that Little Black Sambo "demonstrates rigid, reductive stereotyping, but it was seen as harmless entertainment in 1935. This clip helps show the tremendous cultural shift that has occurred, as this kind of representation is no longer acceptable.

"The coon caricature is one of the most insulting of all anti-Black caricatures. The name itself, an abbreviation of raccoon, is dehumanizing. As with Sambo, the coon was portrayed as a lazy, easily frightened, chronically idle, inarticulate buffoon. The coon acted childish, but he was an adult; albeit a good-for-little adult.

Amos 'n' Andy was a radio-show-turned-television-show from the 1920s through the 1950s about two lower-class African-American men who moved to Chicago, hoping to start a better life. The first sustained protest against the program found its inspiration in the December 1930 issue of Abbott's Monthly, when Bishop W.J. Walls of the African Methodist Episcopal Zion Church wrote an article sharply denouncing Amos 'n' Andy, singling out the lower-class characterizations and the "crude, repetitious, and moronic" dialogue. The Pittsburgh Courier was the nation's second largest African-American newspaper at the time, and publisher Robert Vann expanded Walls's criticism into a full-fledged crusade during a six-month period in 1931.

Al Jolson, a Lithuanian-born vaudeville comedian and blackface "Mammy" singer played a "fumbling idiot" stereotypical African American in a comedy. Although he did bring African-American culture to the spotlight, another blackface performer at the time, Bert Williams, found the performance both vulgar and repressive.

Negative portrayals of black men on TV, the internet, newspaper articles, and video games can be linked, in part, to lower life expectancies. This was found in a study done in 2011 done by the Opportunity Agenda. Another study done shows just how many under representations of black men there actually are. It relates African Americans to drug related crimes which was very exaggerated.

Representation of African-American women 
The representation of African-American women in media has changed throughout the years.  According to Sue Jewell, an urban sociology researcher at the Ohio State University from 1982 to 2011, there are typically three main archetypes of African-American women in media – the Mammy, the Sapphire, and the Jezebel. The Mammy archetype was created during the period of slavery to convey what was acceptable of a slave woman to do and say. This image of a slave woman translated into an asexual, maternal figure. The Mammy archetype manifested, for the most part, in literary works and films during the mid-1900s and was reimagined during the 1980s. A popular manifestation of this archetype is Aunt Jemima.

The second archetype of African-American women, as described by Jewell, is the Sapphire woman. The Sapphire woman, also known as the angry Black woman, is hostile and emasculates Black men through various insults. This archetype was popular during the 1940s and 1950s, created by the Amos and Andy radio show.

The Jezebel archetype, the third described by Jewell, was created in contrast to the ideals of the Mammy slave woman. The Jezebel is a slave woman that satisfied the sexual needs of their white slave masters, and was used to justify the rape of Black slave women. Women who fit this archetype were depicted as fitting European standards of beauty.

Some experts maintain that these historical stereotypes have persisted throughout history and actually influenced the creation of more modern stereotypes. These new stereotypes include the welfare queen, the gold digger, and the video vixen. The first is characterized by her sexual promiscuity and schemes for getting money, the second for her exploitation of good-hearted men, and the third for her sexual promiscuity as well.

Hip-hop music 
The misrepresentation of African-American women has permeated into the music industry, more specifically hip-hop/rap videos. In this form of media, Black women's bodies have been historically hyper-sexualized through images of exotic dancers dressed in a provocative way. In an attempt to oppose those who perpetuate the misrepresentation of Black women, students at Spelman College cancelled a bone-marrow drive in the spring of 2004. They did so as a form of protest against rapper Nelly's, a prominent sponsor of the event, sexist lyrics and videos.

The number of Black women in the music industry has increased throughout the years, despite the industry's focusing on the works of African-American men. African-American women have used the hip-hop genre to increase their representation and reconstruct what their identity means to them, taking the power into their own hands. Famous female African-American rappers include Queen Latifah, Lauryn Hill, Salt NPeppa, Lil’ Kim, Missy Eliot, Nicky Minaj, and Cardi B.

Famous African-American rappers include Kanye West, Jay-Z, 50 Cent and Lil Wayne.

Beauty industry 
Scholars, such as Tracy Owens Patton, have stated that the beauty industry predominantly focuses on and caters to white and European standards of beauty. African-American women have had to navigate these biased beauty standards when it comes to their hair and body image. African slave women were held to the standards of white women, often obtaining better treatment if they had lighter skin or a body type that was similar to their white counterparts. African American women have to change the appearance of their hair in order to fit European standards of beauty, from a young age. The beauty salon has become a way for African-American women to organize for empowerment and health education in their communities.

Reality television 

Reality television shows such as Bad Girls Club, The Real Housewives of Atlanta, and Love & Hip Hop have received criticism and been discussed for their portrayal of Black women, many of whom are depicted as Sapphires, Mammies, and Jezebels. This has led to people, such as Donnetrice Allison, associate professor of Communication Studies and Africana Studies at Stockton University, to state that these shows serve as a new platform for these archetypes to thrive in modern day culture and society.

Representation of Black/African-American LGBT characters 

The 1990s had an increased representation of LGBT characters in film and TV. Since this period of time, the visibility of LGBT characters of color have increased, however the majority of the LGBT characters are still depicted as gay white males.

The LGBT media monitoring organization GLAAD publishes annual reports on representation in film and television, the "Studio Responsibility Index (SRI)" and "Where We Are On TV (WWAT)", respectively. The first SRI was published in 2013 and found that of the 101 films released by major studios in 2012, only 14 films had LGBT characters and, in those films, only 31 different characters could be identified as LBGTQ. Of these 31 characters, only four were Black/African-American (12.9%) in comparison to 26 white characters making up 83.9% of LGBT representation in films for this year. The 2016 report showed a small increase, with 23 out of 125 films containing LGBT characters. Of the 70 LGBT characters, 9 were Black/African-American (13%) in comparison to 48 white characters (69%). The 2013 WWAT report showed that there were 112 LGBT characters that were announced for broadcast and cable and of these characters, 13% were black while 71% were white. The 2017 report found that there were 329 LBGTQ characters on television. Black LGBT characters made up 12% of this representation with 40 characters compared to 65% for white characters.

Outlets such as the Pacific Center for Human Growth and Color of Change have been critical of depictions of black LGBT characters, stating that media outlets often rely on one-dimensional, stereotypical images of Black characters as opposed to dynamic and complex portrayals that reflect the complexity and authenticity of Black people's lives around the country. Critics have further stated that  black characters are typically incorporated within "hegemonic white worlds void of any hint of African American traditions, social struggle, racial conflicts, and cultural difference."

According to Dustin Collins, Black gay men are usually portrayed in the media as "swishy queens" or overly aggressive. The character of Keith Charles, a gay black man, in Six Feet Under has been cited as an example of this in a 2013 Sexuality and Culture article by Jay Poole. He argued that Keith is portrayed as overly masculine, aggressive, and powerful which reinforces stereotypical characteristics of African-American men. This is in comparison to his partner, David Fisher, a white gay man, who is portrayed as more feminine as he is in charge of household duties. Lafayette Reynolds of True Blood has also been seen as a black LGBT stereotype, as his character is portrayed as a flamboyant "swishy queen" with an athletic, muscular build and can be very aggressive. In contrast, Jennifer De Clue has highlighted the film Moonlight as breaking from the stereotype of the over-masculinity of black LGBT characters, as the main character, Chiron Harris, is physically abused for being gay and not fitting into the ideal definitions of masculinity.

Black lesbians are typically associated with aggression, eroticism, extreme attractiveness/desirability (femme), and occasionally butch. In Set It Off, Ursula, a black lesbian character is represented by only being an erotic object. Most of her scenes are her sexual interactions with her girlfriend Cleo. Cleopatra "Cleo" Sims, also a black lesbian, is seen as being aggressive and butch. In The Wire, Shakima Greggs is portrayed as masculine and part of the Baltimore police department's "old boy's club". Felicia Pearson is seen as extremely masculine/butch to the point where her gender presentation is blurred between female and male.

Transgender women are typically portrayed as passing as women making them seem artificial or fake. Transgender women of color are also disproportionately represented as victims of hate crimes. The character, Sophia Burset, from the Netflix series, Orange is the New Black is a black trans woman, who reinforces these stereotypes since she has used medical surgery and hormones to appear more as a woman. Other characters in this show constantly make comments indicating they view Sophia as not a real woman. Writer Michael Chavez also argues that Sophia plays into the stereotypical hyperfeminization of trans women in the media through her role of the hairdresser in the prison salon and knowledge of hair, fashion, and makeup.

Additionally, drugs, violence and low socioeconomic status are usually part of the identity of black LGBT characters. These stereotypical representations of black LGBT characters reinforce the cultural stereotypes in the United States that all black people are poor, extremely violent, and/or drug abusers.

Television 
The portrayals of African Americans in movies and television shows in America reinforce negative stereotypes. Professor Narissra M. Punyanunt-Carter, from the department of Communications Studies at Texas Tech, found many facts in her research paper, The Perceived Realism of African American Portrayals on Television, "After reviewing numerous television shows, Seggar and Wheeler (1973) found that African Americans on these programs were generally depicted in service or blue-collar occupations, such as a house cleaner or a postal worker". This is in contrast to their white counter-parts who are business executives and business owners. "In contrast to White characters, research indicates that African Americans have lower socioeconomic status (SES) roles on television than Anglo Americans" (Segger & Wheeler, 1973) (pp243).

She also found that "the U.S. Commission on Civil Rights (1977) found that African American television portrayals typically depicted the following stereotypic personality characteristics: inferior, stupid, comical, immoral, and dishonest"(pp243).   Seeing negative images on television, and film of African Americans can be seen as a covert propaganda that transitively affects the subconscious mind, and negatively shapes the psychology of the observer.  Carter also echoed this by illustrating what she found in another research study.  She said, "Fujioka's study illustrated that when firsthand knowledge is not present, television images have a huge effect on viewers' perceptions. In addition, this study found cultural differences in responses to positive images of Blacks among Japanese and American students. American students tended to be more influenced by negative messages of Blacks than Japanese students   Fujioka's research affirmed that affective assessments of television portrayals of African Americans are highly related to the development of stereotypes"(pp244).  All the negative imagery goes back to the Antebellum Era (before the fall of slavery)1793–1861.

Sports 
In sports that are featured in media such as on ESPN and some other sports channels, representation of African-American men and women is important. In the past, segregation played a part in representation of the community. “In baseball, there were established ‘Negro’ leagues for non-white players (while these leagues were predominantly African-American, there were also several Latin-Americans playing in the leagues, as well) through the early 1950s”  (Keifer, Mitchell).  In her article, Andrea Eagleman talks about the history of the representation. “Research shows that racial and ethnic minority athletes and international athletes have long been portrayed in stereotypical roles in the mass media since the 1880s, when Black players were stereotyped…”(Eagleman, Andrea).

Reasons for misrepresentation

Working in the media

Historically, the participation in media production by minorities in the US has been low. Despite recent gains especially in television, significant racial disparities remain.  In 1971, three years after the Federal Communications Commission adopted rules to foster more diverse programming, only nine percent of full-time employees in radio and television were visible minorities. In 1978, American Society of News Editors set a goal to have their sector mirror the diversity of the American population in general.

As the years progressed, the percentage of minorities in the workplace began to grow; in 1997, visible minorities made up 20 percent of the broadcasting work force. Yet the trend towards inclusiveness, while generally growing, has been uneven. For example, a 2007 report showed that blacks, Latinos, Asians, and Native Americans made up only 13.65% of American newsrooms. The numbers dwindle still further at the upper levels of media management: during the 2013–2014 season only 5.5% of executive-level television producers were people of color.

Ownership 
Ownership in the media helps control what media is being broadcast, which also helps define who and how people are being portrayed. There is a significant under representation of African Americans when it comes to the ownership of media. A report by the Free Press entitled "Off The Dial" reports of all commercial broadcast radio stations, African Americans own only 3.4%.
In populations with large African-American markets, the number of black-owned stations are not correlated with the large market. Difficulty with capital access along with other barriers to entry may be the cause.
African-American owners may be purchasing broadcast stations in the only place they can – small midwestern markets, due to racism in small southern communities where the black population exists in the majority. Therefore, a valuable media perspective is lost in these communities.

Stereotypes

Communication and media research suggest that the mass media is an important source of information about African Americans and their image. This public image influences public perception, and is capable of reinforcing opinions about African Americans.

Typically, these opinions are unfavorable and highlight negative stereotypes associated with African Americans. Oftentimes the portrayals' very medium, such as television, is the origin of such stereotypes. Television has been cited for broadcasting material that displays an overrepresentation of African Americans as lawbreakers. A study of TV crime newscasts indicated that newscast content displayed far more counts of African Americans' crimes than that of any other racial classification.

The representation of African Americans in media has remained the same for a while, almost since the representation of African Americans in television ads exceeded in 1991. It has been shown that even positive stereotypes of African Americans in media can have an effect of prejudice on consumers. The roles of African Americans in media has evolved over time. On typical cable channels the amount of ads shown with African Americans has become neutral, but on channels such as B.E.T. where the viewership is mostly that of African Americans, all of the ads consist of healthy, stable, independent and enthusiastic African Americans who are goal oriented. African Americans now have bigger roles in media such as that of reporters, business owners and artists. African-American women have made an uprising in mainstream media as confident and strong individuals. Several organizations have been based on the empowerment of African-American women in media. 
The representation of African-American women in media has also made an increase since beauty expectations have changed. Cultural appropriation has somewhat changed the beauty standards of media. Fashion styles have taken on the cultural dynamics of many countries.

Minority Ownership Task Force 
The lack of representation has spawned a number of U.S. Federal Communications Commission (FCC) initiatives to increase diversity. In 1969 the Supreme Court ruled that the implicated FCC regulations that were designed to increase viewpoint diversity were not in conflict with the First Amendment, and the people "as a whole" retain their interest in free speech and the right to have "diverse programming" via the constitution. In the 1960s the release of a report by the National Advisory Commission on Civil Disorders (the Kerner Commission) reported that the "media" did not effectively communicate to the majority of their decidedly white audience the sense of "degradation, misery, and hopelessness of living in the ghetto."

The commission also continued to report that unless the media became more sensitive to the portrayal of African Americans specifically, the degrading stereotypical content would continue to be displayed. In response to this commission, the FCC initiated a race-neutral regulatory policy to increase the likelihood that African Americans would be employed with a broadcaster. This included changing hiring practices of broadcasters to eliminate racial discrimination from the employment process. However, despite these rules, the FCC found that levels of representation did not change significantly.

To continue its effort to provide access to the "minority voice", the FCC established the Minority Ownership Task Force (MOTF). This group would focus on researching ways to include minorities in the broadcasting industry. The FCC notes that having a sufficient representation of the minority would be serving the needs of not only the interests of the minority community, but would "enrich and educate" the majority.

Metro Broadcasting v. FCC
The case of Metro Broadcasting v. FCC in 1990 challenged the constitutionality of two minority preference policies of the Federal Communications Commission. Under the first policy challenged by Metro Broadcasting, Inc., minority applicants for broadcast licenses were given preference if all other relevant factors were roughly equal. The second policy, known as the "distress sale," was challenged by Shurberg Broadcasting of Hartford, Inc. This policy allowed broadcasters in danger of losing their licenses to sell their stations to minority buyers before the FCC formally ruled on the viability of the troubled stations.

The FCC's minority preference policies were constitutional because they provided appropriate remedies for discrimination victims and were aimed at the advancement of legitimate congressional objectives for program diversity. The FCC's minority preference policies were closely related to, and substantially advanced, Congress's legitimate interest in affording the public a diverse array of programming options. The availability of program diversity serves the entire viewing and listening public, not just minorities, and is therefore consistent with First Amendment values.

See also
African-American representation in Hollywood
Early film racism in the United States
Misogyny in hip hop culture
Portrayal of black people in comics
Racial bias in criminal news in the United States
Video vixen
Media portrayal of LGBT people

References

External links
Booknotes interview with Jannette Dates on Split Image: African Americans in the Mass Media, September 23, 1990.

African-American cultural history
American culture
Social history of the United States
History of racism in the cinema of the United States
Cultural appropriation
Anti-black racism in the United States
Mass media issues
Media coverage and representation